Jandy is a given name. Notable people with the name include:

Jandy Feliz ( José del Carmen Feliz Matos, born 1977), Dominican singer-songwriter
Jandy Nelson (born 1965), American young-adult author

See also
Janda (surname)